Wildcard is the seventh studio album by American country music singer Miranda Lambert. It was released on November 1, 2019, via RCA Records Nashville. The album was produced by Jay Joyce, marking the first time Lambert has worked with the producer. It features the singles "It All Comes Out in the Wash", "Bluebird", and "Settling Down".

The album received a Grammy Award for Best Country Album and was nominated for the Country Music Association Award for Album of the Year.

Content
"It All Comes Out in the Wash" was released on July 18, 2019, as its lead single. Five other tracks—"Locomotive", "Mess with My Head", "Bluebird", "Way Too Pretty for Prison", and "Pretty Bitchin'"—were also previewed ahead of the album. "Way Too Pretty for Prison" was inspired by Little Big Town's Karen Fairchild and was recorded as a collaboration with Maren Morris. Lambert has co-writing credits on all 14 tracks.

Promotion
In support of the album's release, Miranda Lambert announced a 27-city North American tour, the Wildcard Tour which commenced on January 16, 2020, in Tupelo, Mississippi at the BancorpSouth Arena and was scheduled to conclude on May 9, 2020, in Montreal, Quebec at the Bell Centre. Supporting acts included Cody Johnson, LANCO, Randy Rogers Band, Parker McCollum and an unknown act to be announced.

Commercial performance
The album debuted at number 4 on the US Billboard's 200 and on the Top Country Albums chart at number 1 with 53,000, album-equivalent units, including 44,000 pure album sales. It is her seventh number one country album. As of March 2020, it has sold 110,300 copies, with 170,000 units consumed in total in the United States. The album sold an additional 250,000 album units in 2020, per Rolling Stone's top 200 albums of the year.

Track listing
Adapted from Rolling Stone.

Personnel
Credit by AllMusic

Luke Dick - electric guitar
Dan Dugmore - dobro, acoustic guitar, lap steel guitar, mandolin, pedal steel guitar
Fred Eltringham - djembe, drums, gang vocals on "Way Too Pretty for Prison"
Jason Hall - gang vocals on "Way Too Pretty for Prison"
Jaxon Hargrove - gang vocals on "Way Too Pretty for Prison"
Natalie Hemby - background vocals
Jay Joyce - bongos, clavinet, drums, Farfisa organ, Fender Rhodes, 6-string acoustic guitar, 12-string acoustic guitar, acoustic guitar, electric guitar, ganjo, Hammond B-3 organ, keyboards, mandolin, percussion, programming, shaker, tambourine, gang vocals on "Way Too Pretty for Prison"
Joel King - bass guitar
Miranda Lambert - lead vocals, background vocals, gang vocals on "Way Too Pretty for Prison"
Hillary Lindsey - acoustic guitar, background vocals
Jimmy Mansfield - gang vocals on "Way Too Pretty for Prison"
The McCrary Sisters - background vocals
Rob McNelley - acoustic guitar, electric guitar, gang vocals on "Way Too Pretty for Prison"
Travis Meadows - harmonica
Ashley Monroe - background vocals
Maren Morris - duet vocals on "Way Too Pretty for Prison"

Charts

Weekly charts

Year-end charts

Certifications

References

2019 albums
Miranda Lambert albums
RCA Records albums
Albums produced by Jay Joyce
Country rock albums by American artists
Grammy Award for Best Country Album